Impress Group is a Bangladeshi diversified conglomerate based in Dhaka.

History 
Impress Group was established in 1978 as Impress Limited, an advertising agency. The Directors of the Group are Abdur Rashid Majumder, Enayet Husain Siraj, Faridur Reza Sagar, Reaz Ahmed Khan, and Abdul Muqeed Majumdar.

Impress Group established Impress Telefilms Limited in 1996.

Impress Group financed Abdul Muktadir to establish Incepta Pharmaceuticals in 1999. The company started retail distribution in January 2000. Incepta is the second largest pharmaceutical company in Bangladesh.

Impress Group's television channel, channel i, started on air operations from 1 October 1999. Shykh Seraj is the Direct and head of news of Channel i.

Impress Group starts a fourth nightly entertainment magazine called Ananda Alo in 2008.

Impress Group becomes the majority shareholder of Karnaphuli Fashions Limited, Karnaphuli Knitting and Dyeing Limited, and Newtex Designs Limited in 2009. The companies are reorganized under the Impress-Newtex Composite Textiles limited. In 2010, Brummer & Partners Asset Management (Bangladesh) Limited purchases a stake in Impress-Newtex Composite Textiles limited and announced further investment in the company to expand production capacity.

Incepta Pharmaceuticals starts manufacturing vaccines in Bangladesh in 2011. It is the first local vaccine manufacturer in Bangladesh.

Impress Group founded Impress Boutique Cinema to finance indie filmmakers on 30 March 2013.

Incepta Aviations and Impress Capital Limited starts operations in 2014. Impress Aviation provides charter helicopter services in Bangladesh.

On 28 July 2016, Incepta Vaccines starts mass-producing vaccines at a facility in Savar Upazila. A subsidiary of Impress Group, Next Space Limited is hired as a subcontractor for Rooppur Nuclear Power Plant.

In January 2021, Arastoo Khan was made the chief executive officer and managing director of Impress Capital Limited. He is the former chairperson of Bangladesh Commerce Bank and Islami Bank Bangladesh. Abdul Muktadir, chairperson of Incepta Vaccines said that they can produce COVID-19 vaccines for the COVID-19 pandemic in Bangladesh if they were provided a blueprint for the vaccine production.

Businesses 
 Channel i
 Build Bangladesh
 Impress Fashion Limited
 Impress Wear Limited
 Impress Boutique Cinema
 Incepta Pharmaceuticals
 Impress Aviation Limited
 Impress-Newtex Composite Textiles limited
 iSoftware
 Prokriti o Jibon Foundation
 Impress Capital Limited
 Incepta Vaccines Limited
 Impress Audio Vision Limited
 Impress Printing Limited
 Icon Telefilm Limited
 ipositive
 Maheen Label Tex Limited
 Impress Accessories Limited
 M.R.S. Syndicate Limited
 IPORT Logistics Limited
 iPort Aviation Limited
 iXPRESS Limited
 Next Spaces Limited
 Impress Energy and Services Limited
 Ananda Alo
 iDIGITAL
 iCreation
 Innovative Research and Consultancy Limited
 Radio Bhumi
 Help D Bangladesh
 Allied Garments Limited
 Fashrobe Garments Limited
 AlterSense Limited
 Newtext Knit Fashions Limited
 Impress Telefilms Limited

References 

1978 establishments in Bangladesh
Organisations based in Dhaka
Conglomerate companies of Bangladesh